This is a list of museums in Ticino, Switzerland.

Other relevant institutions 
 Association for the preservation of the artistic and architectural heritage in Vallemaggia 
 Association Landscape Bosco Guin
 Association of the ethnographic museums of Ticino
 Association of friends of the museums of Ticino
 Centre Nature Vallemaggia 
 Centre of dialectology and ethnography 
 Foundation Val Bavona
 Foundation Verzasca 
 International Association for Alpine History (IAAH)
 Society of Ticino for art and nature

References

External links 

 Observatory of museums in canton Ticino 

 
Museum
 
Ticino